Donkey Tail can refer to:

 Euphorbia myrsinites, a plant
 Sedum morganianum, another plant
 Donkey's Tail, a group of Russian Futurist artists in the early 1910s. Marc Chagall was a notable member.